Eda Erdem Dündar (born Eda Erdem 22 June 1987) is a Turkish professional volleyball player.  She currently plays for both Fenerbahçe SK and the national team and is the captain of both teams.

Career
Eda Erdem has been playing for Fenerbahçe with jersey number 14 since 2008. Before she joined Fenerbahçe, she had played for Beşiktaş for 4 years (2004–2008). She played more than 300 times for the Turkish national team.

In Doha, Qatar, Eda won the 2010 FIVB World Club Championship, playing with Fenerbahçe and earned the Best Server award.

Eda Erdem also won the Best Server award and the silver medal with her national team at the 2011 European League.

She played with Fenerbahçe in the 2012 FIVB Club World Championship held in Doha and helped her team to win the bronze medal after defeating Puerto Rico's Lancheras de Cataño 3-0.

Awards

Individuals
 2009 Turkish Supercup "Most Valuable Player"
 2010 European Volleyball League "Best Blocker"
 2010 FIVB World Club Championship "Best Server"
 2010-11 Aroma Women's Volleyball League "Best Spiker"
 2011 European League "Best Server"
 2015 European Championship "Best Middle Blockers"
 2015–16 CEV Women's Champions League "Best Middle Blockers"
 2017 European Championship "Best Middle Blocker"
 2018 Nations League "Best Middle Blocker"
 2019 European Championship "Best Middle Blocker"
 2020 CEV Tokyo qualification "Best Middle Blocker"
 2021 Nations League "Best Middle Blocker"
 2021 European Championship "Best Middle Blocker"

National team
 2009 European League -  Silver Medal
 2010 European League -  Bronze Medal
 2011 European League -  Silver Medal
 2011 European Championship -  Bronze Medal
 2012 FIVB World Grand Prix - 
 2017 European Championship -  Bronze Medal
 2019 European Championship -  Silver Medal
 2021 Nations League -  Bronze Medal
 2021 European Championship -  Bronze Medal

Clubs
 2008-09 Women's CEV Top Teams Cup -  3rd place, with Fenerbahçe Acıbadem
 2008-09 Aroma Women's Volleyball League -  Champion, with Fenerbahçe Acıbadem
 2008-09 Turkish Cup -  Runner-Up, with Fenerbahçe Acıbadem
 2009 Turkish Super Cup -  Champion, with Fenerbahçe Acıbadem
 2009-10 Aroma Women's Volleyball League -  Champion, with Fenerbahçe Acıbadem
 2009-10 Turkish Cup -  Champion, with Fenerbahçe Acıbadem
 2009-10 CEV Champions League -  Runner-Up, with Fenerbahçe Acıbadem
 2010 FIVB World Club Championship -  Champion, with Fenerbahçe Acıbadem
 2010 Turkish Super Cup -  Champion, with Fenerbahçe Acıbadem
 2010-11 CEV Champions League -  3rd place, with Fenerbahçe Acıbadem
 2010-11 Aroma Women's Volleyball League -  Champion, with Fenerbahçe Acıbadem
 2011-12 CEV Champions League -  Champion, with Fenerbahçe Universal
 2011 Turkish Super Cup -  Runner-Up, with Fenerbahçe Universal
 2012 FIVB World Club Championship –  3rd place, with Fenerbahçe
 2012-13 CEV Cup -  Runner-Up, with Fenerbahçe
 2013-14 CEV Cup -  Champion, with Fenerbahçe
 2013–14 Turkish Women's Volleyball League -  Runner-Up, with Fenerbahçe
 2013-14 Turkish Cup -  Runner-Up, with Fenerbahçe
 2014 Turkish Super Cup -  Runner-Up, with Fenerbahçe Grundig
 2014-15 Turkish Cup -  Champion, with Fenerbahçe Grundig
 2014–15 Turkish Women's Volleyball League -  Champion, with Fenerbahçe Grundig
 2014–15 Turkish Super Cup -  Champion, with Fenerbahçe Grundig
 2016–17 Turkish Volleyball Cup  Champion, with Fenerbahçe Grundig
 2016–17 Turkish Volleyball League  Champion, with Fenerbahçe Grundig
 2021–22 Turkish Super Cup -  Champion, with Fenerbahçe Beko

See also
Turkish women in sports

References

External links
 
 
 
 
 

1987 births
Living people
Volleyball players from Istanbul
Turkish women's volleyball players
Beşiktaş volleyballers
Fenerbahçe volleyballers
Olympic volleyball players of Turkey
Volleyball players at the 2012 Summer Olympics
Turkey women's international volleyball players
Mediterranean Games gold medalists for Turkey
Mediterranean Games medalists in volleyball
Competitors at the 2005 Mediterranean Games
Volleyball players at the 2020 Summer Olympics
21st-century Turkish women